This is a selected list of browser games, playable in internet browsers or with software such as Adobe Flash.

Single-player games

Multiplayer games
This is a selected list of multiplayer browser games. These games are usually free, with extra, payable options sometimes available. See the List of browser games for single-player browser games.

The game flow of the games may be either turn-based, where players are given a number of "turns" to execute their actions or real-time, where player actions take a real amount of time to complete. Most notable is the real-time strategy genre.

See also
 Multiplayer video game
 MMORPG
 Browser based game
 List of massively multiplayer online games
 List of massively multiplayer online role-playing games
 List of free multiplayer online games
 List of free massively multiplayer online games

Notes

References

 
Browser games